"Take Me Away" is a song recorded by the German eurodance band Culture Beat. It was released in June 1996 as the third single from their third studio album Inside Out. A CD maxi with new remixes was also available, but it was marketed at the same time as the other media

The song was a hit in many countries, particularly in Finland where it reached number 6.

Critical reception
Shawnee Smith, of Billboard magazine gave the song a mixed review, saying that while the song "hasn't moved far beyond that formula [of "Mr. Vain"]", lead singer Tania Evans is "quite the charmer, and producer/writer Cyborg has a way with hooks that is hard to resist."

Music video
The music video for "Take Me Away" was directed by Nikolas Mann. It first aired in September 1996.

Track listings

 CD Maxi-single (Europe, 1996)
 "Take Me Away" (Radio Edit) – 3:55
 "Take Me Away" (Extended Mix) – 6:59
 "Take Me Away" (Doom Mix) – 6:02
 "Take Me Away" (Sweetbox Hotpants Mix) – 6:02
 "Take Me Away" (Aboria Euro Mix) – 6:11
 "Take Me Away" (Special A Capella Version (Not Normal Mix)) – 3:23
 "Hamana" - 5:21

 CD Maxi-single  - Remix (Germany, 1996)
 "Take Me Away" (M'N'S Gazelled Up Mix) – 7:37
 "Take Me Away" (M'N'S Full On Vocal Mix) – 6:59
 "Take Me Away" (GEDO Mix) – 6:16
 "Take Me Away" (Doug Laurent Mix) – 6:10
 "Take Me Away" (Tokapi's House Of Summer Mix) – 5:37
 "Take Me Away" (Hard To Be Hip Mix) – 5:57

 CD Maxi-single (USA, 1997)
 "Take Me Away" (Radio Edit) – 3:37
 "Take Me Away" (Aboria Euro Radio) – 3:41
 "Take Me Away" (Sweetbox Hotpants Radio Edit) – 3:33
 "Take Me Away" (Extended Mix) – 6:55
 "Take Me Away" (Aboria Euro Mix) – 6:07
 "Take Me Away" (Sweetbox Hotpants Mix) – 5:58
 "Take Me Away" (M'N's Gazelled Up Mix) – 7:21
 "Take Me Away" (Doug Laurent Mix) – 6:07

Charts

References

1996 singles
Culture Beat songs
Songs written by Jay Supreme
1995 songs
Music videos directed by Nikolas Mann
Dance Pool singles